The Guane were a South American people that lived mainly in the area of Santander and north of Boyacá, both departments of present-day central-Colombia. They were farmers cultivating cotton, pineapple and other crops, and skilled artisans working in cotton textiles. The Guane lived north of the Chicamocha River, around the Chicamocha Canyon in an area stretching from Vélez in the south to the capital of Santander; Bucaramanga in the north. Other sources state their territory did not extend so far north. Guane, a corregimiento of Barichara, Santander, is said to have been the capital of the Guane people.

Etymology 
The word guane in the Chibcha language of the people means "tree" or "lower part of a leaf", or "skirt".

Description 
The Guane made their own weapons, including arrows and spears. They interchanged plants for the stewpot with the Chitarero on the east and the Muisca to the south of their territories. The mantle making of the Guanes was well known in pre-Columbian Colombia. Mantles made from cotton have been dated back to the 11th century AD. The Guane cultivated tobacco and made products of fique.

Like the Maya and many other civilizations in the world, the Guane deliberately deformed the skulls of their children.

In 1586, there were still some Guane left but there were no further references found after that date; nevertheless, the local archives indicated that they did not disappear completely. They mixed heavily with the Spanish colonizers, as the Guane were said to have European traits and very light skin.

Like the Muisca, U'wa and Lache, the Guane spoke a Chibchan language. They adored Bochica, the messenger god in the Muisca religion. The Guane traded with their neighbouring indigenous groups; Lache to the east, U'wa to the northeast, Muzo to the south and Muisca to the southeast.

Rock art produced by the Guane have been found around the Chicamocha Canyon and on the Mesa de los Santos, Santander.

The Guane people chewed coca combined with calcitic grains, using poporos.

Municipalities belonging to Guane territory 
The Guane inhabited the area of central and south Santander, around the Chicamocha Canyon and a small part of Boyacá.

See also 

Muisca
Conquest of the Guane
Muzo, U'wa
Guayupe, Lache, Yarigui

References

External links 

  Video about the Guane people and their culture

Indigenous peoples in Colombia
Andean civilizations